was a samurai warrior and daimyo from Akizuki clan, son of Akizuki Kiyotane, who was defeated by the Ōtomo clan. 

Later he joined the Shimazu clan. In 1585, Tanezane supported the Shimazu in an offensive against the Ōtomo at the Siege of Iwaya Castle.

In 1587, he fought with Shimazu against Toyotomi Hideyoshi in Kyūshū, an island of Japan.

In 1596, Tanezane was succeeded by his son Tanenaga. After the Battle of Sekigahara, Tanenaga was transferred to Takanabe han (in Hyuga, 20,000 koku).

Notes

1548 births
1596 deaths
Daimyo
Samurai